Mideopsidae is a family of prostigs in the order Trombidiformes. There are about 7 genera and 19 described species in Mideopsidae.

Genera
 Guineaxonopsis
 Horreolanus Mitchell, 1955
 Kuschelacarus
 Mideopsis Neuman, 1880
 Nudomideopsis Szalay, 1945
 Paramideopsis Smith, 1983
 Xystonotus Wolcott, 1900

References

Further reading

 
 
 
 

Trombidiformes
Acari families